The highest-selling singles in Japan are ranked in the Oricon Weekly Chart, which is published by Oricon Style magazine. The data are compiled by Oricon based on each singles' weekly physical sales.

Chart history

See also
2011 in music

References 

2011 in Japanese music
Japan Oricon
Lists of number-one songs in Japan